is a city located in Gifu, Japan. , the city had an estimated population of 67,909 in 26,327 households, and a population density of 1300 persons per km2, in 26,367 households.

Geography
Hashima is located in the Nōbi Plain of southwest Gifu Prefecture, with the Kiso River to the east and the  Nagara River to the west. Much of the city area is low-lying and subject to frequent flooding.

Climate
The city has a climate characterized by characterized by hot and humid summers, and mild winters (Köppen climate classification Cfa).  The average annual temperature in Hashima is 15.5 °C. The average annual rainfall is 1849 mm with September as the wettest month. The temperatures are highest on average in August, at around 27.8 °C, and lowest in January, at around 4.1 °C.

Neighbouring municipalities
Gifu Prefecture
Gifu
Ōgaki
Kaizu
Anpachi
Wanouchi
Kasamatsu
Aichi Prefecture
Ichinomiya
Inazawa

Demographics
Per Japanese census data, the population of Hashima has recently plateaued after a long period of growth.

History
The area around Hashima was part of traditional Mino Province.  During the Edo period, most of the area was divided between territory under the control of Owari Domain, and tenryō territory under the direct control of the  Tokugawa shogunate. During the post-Meiji restoration cadastral reforms, the area was organised into Hashima District, Gifu. On July 1, 1889 with the establishment of the modern municipalities system, the town of Takenohana was created. On April 1, 1954 Takenohana merged with nine neighbouring villages to form the city of Hashima.

Government
Hashima has a mayor-council form of government with a directly elected mayor and a unicameral city legislature of 18 members.

Economy
Hashima is a regional commercial center, with agriculture and light industry, notably that of woven cloth dominating the local economy.

Education
Hashima has eight public elementary schools and five public middle schools operated by the city government, and one public high school operated by the Gifu Prefectural Board of Education. The prefecture also operates one special education school.  The Gifu College of Nursing is located in Hashima.

Transportation

Railway
  Central Japan Railway Company (JR Tōkai) - Tōkaidō Shinkansen
 
 Meitetsu - Takehana Line
  -  -  -  -  - 
 Meitetsu - Hashima Line
 -

Highway
  Meishin Expressway

References

External links

 

 
Cities in Gifu Prefecture